Cnemidophorus sexlineatus viridis, commonly known as the prairie racerunner, is a subspecies of lizard endemic to the United States. It is a subspecies of Cnemidophorus sexlineatus, which is commonly known as the six-lined racerunner lizard.

Geographic range
C. s. viridis is found throughout the short grass prairie habitat of the midwestern United States, from Colorado to Nebraska, south to northern Texas. Southern New Jersey.

Description 
The prairie racerunner is generally dark green or dark brown in color, with seven yellow stripes which run the length of the body from the head to the tail, and has a white underside. They are slender-bodied, and have a tail that is nearly twice the length of their body.

Behavior 
Like most species of whiptail lizard, the prairie racerunner is diurnal and insectivorous. They are most active in the early morning, and hide as the heat of the day rises.

References 
Herps of Texas: Cnemidophorus sexlineatus viridis
Six-lined Racerunner - Cnemidophorus sexlineatus Species account from the Iowa Reptile and Amphibian Field Guide

External links

Cnemidophorus
Reptiles of the United States
Fauna of the Western United States
Fauna of the Plains-Midwest (United States)
Taxa named by Charles Herbert Lowe